Dois Córregos is a municipality in the state of São Paulo in Brazil. The population is 27,512 (2020 est.) in an area of 633 km². The elevation is 673 m.

References

Municipalities in São Paulo (state)